Madison School District can refer to:
Madison Metropolitan School District (Wisconsin)
Madison School District (Idaho)
Madison District Public Schools, a school district serving the south end of Madison Heights, Michigan, in Greater Detroit